Katha District is the northeasternmost district in Sagaing Region of Myanmar. Its administrative center is the town of Katha.

Townships

The district consists of the townships of 
Banmauk Township
Indaw Township
Katha Township
Tigyaing Township

On 5 December 2018, Kawlin Township, Wuntho Township, and Pinlebu Township were separated from Katha district to form Kawlin District.

Economy
The area is supported by rice farming, fisheries and timbering.

Notes

 
Sagaing Region